James So'oialo (born 2 March 1989) is a Samoan rugby union player. He currently plays as a fly-half for Horowhenua Kapiti in the Heartland Championship. He made his international debut in 2011 when he was part of the Samoan team at the 2011 Rugby World Cup where he played in one match. He signed for Irish provincial rugby team Connacht for the 2013/2014 season. On 26 October, after only having arrived in late September, Connacht released So'oialo from his contract on 'compassionate grounds', and he returned to  New Zealand. He was included in the Melbourne Rising squad for the NRC 2019 season as a fly half.

References

External links

1989 births
Living people
Rugby union players from Wellington City
New Zealand sportspeople of Samoan descent
Samoan rugby union players
Samoa international rugby union players
Castres Olympique players
Connacht Rugby players
Wellington rugby union players
Expatriate rugby union players in Ireland
Expatriate rugby union players in France
Sportspeople from Apia
Rugby union centres
Expatriate rugby union players in Australia
Melbourne Rising players
Melbourne Rebels players